The Expressway network of Cambodia currently consists of one expressway under construction and one under planning. The government has noted three goals for developing an expressway network:
 Regional Integration with neighboring countries
 Linking the wealthier Phnom Penh with other cities to let other provinces benefit from the development
 Improving the transportation in Cambodia, reducing congestion and allow more suitable roads for heavy trucks

Phnom Penh-Sihanoukville Expressway 
The first expressway, the Phnom Penh-Sihanoukville Expressway, is funded by the China Road and Bridge Corporation at a cost of US$2 billion under a build-operate-transfer contract.

This will allow the travel time between the two terminal cities to be halved from 6 hours.

The road will be opened to the public starting on October 1, 2022, until October 31, 2022, under a one-month trial free of charge.

Phnom Penh-Bavet Expressway 
On November 9, 2022, Cambodian Prime Minister Samdech Hun Sen and Chinese Premier Li Keqiang has signed a memorandum of understanding to build the 138 km Phnom Penh-Bavet Expressway.

The second expressway, the Phnom Penh-Bavet being studied and planned by the China Road and Bridge Corporation, and expected to start construction in June 2023. The expressway will have a length of 138 kilometers, with width of 25.5 meters, consist of 4 lanes (2 lanes a side).

Phnom Penh-Bavet Expressway is expected to booster the transportation and import-export between Cambodia and Vietnam and reduce the transportation cost and time between the two countries.

List

See also
 Transport in Cambodia

Notes

References